Henry Walter Livingston (June 12, 1768 – December 22, 1810) was a United States Representative from the state of New York.

Early life
Livingston was born in Livingston, Columbia County, New York to Continental Congressman Walter Livingston (1740–1797) and Cornelia Schuyler (1746–1822). He was baptized on June 12, 1768 and had probably been born on the same day.  His sister, Gertrude Livingston (1778–1864) who married William Cutting (1773–1820), was the mother of Francis Brockholst Cutting (1804–1870), also a U.S. Representative from New York's 8th congressional district.  His youngest sister, Harriet Livingston (1783–1826), was married to Robert Fulton (1765–1815).  His paternal grandfather was Robert Livingston (1708–1790), the 3rd Lord of Livingston Manor. His mother was the granddaughter of Pieter Schuyler (1657–1724), the 1st Mayor of Albany.

He graduated from Yale College in 1786, studied law, was admitted to the bar and commenced practice in New York City.

Career
From October 2, 1787 to September 11, 1789, Livingston was a clerk in the office of Alexander Hamilton, who issued a "certificate of clerkship" for him on April 29, 1790, stating that "he is of good moral Character."

From 1792 to 1794 he was private secretary to Gouverneur Morris, who was then Minister to France.

Livingston was then Judge of the Court of Common Pleas of Columbia County. He was a member of the New York State Assembly in 1802 and again in 1810.  He was elected as a Federalist to the 8th and 9th Congresses, holding office from March 4, 1803 to March 3, 1807.

Personal life
In 1796, he married Mary Masters Allen (1776–1855), the daughter of James Allen (1742–1778), and granddaughter of William Allen (1704–1780), the Chief Justice of Pennsylvania, and great-granddaughter of Andrew Hamilton (c.1676–1741), a Speaker of the Pennsylvania House of Representatives, members of a prominent Pennsylvania family. They were the parents of:

 Henry Walter Livingston (1798–1848), who married Caroline de Grasse de Pau (1806–1871), daughter of Francis De Pau, a French shipping magnate and slaver, and Silvie de Grasse, daughter of a French count, in 1823
 Walter Livingston (1799–1872), who married Mary Livingston Greenleaf (1802–1886), daughter of James Greenleaf, in 1828
 James Allen Livingston (1801–1825), who died unmarried in Rouen, France
 Mary Livingston (1803–1880), who married James Thomson, Jr. (d. 1847), in 1825
 Elizabeth Livingston (1807–1860), who married William Denning Henderson (1803–1852), in 1828
 Cornelia Livingston (1808–1884), who married Carroll Livingston (1805–1867), son of Henry Brockholst Livingston, in 1828
 Anne Greenleaf Livingston (1809–1887), who married Anson Livingston (1807–1873), another son of Henry Brockholst Livingston, in 1829

He died at his home in Livingston, New York on December 22, 1810.  This home in Livingston, known as "The Hill," was added to the National Register of Historic Places in 1971.

Henry W. Livingston and his wife were entombed in a vault at the Henry W. Livingston House.  In 1904 the vault was broken into, apparently by grave robbers.  The remains were scattered, and efforts to recover them and identify the thieves were unsuccessful.

References

External links

1768 births
1810 deaths
Yale College alumni
People from Livingston, New York
New York (state) lawyers
Members of the New York State Assembly
Henry Walter
Schuyler family
American people of Dutch descent
Federalist Party members of the United States House of Representatives from New York (state)
Burials in New York (state)